Armed Forces Day is observed in Bangladesh on 21 November. This signifies the day in 1971, when the members of the Bangladesh army, navy and air force were officially united and launched joint operations against the Pakistan occupation forces. On 16 December 1971, the Pakistani Army of 93,000 surrendered to the allied forces of Bangladesh Forces and Indian Army (The Joint Command), ending the Liberation War of Bangladesh.

Significance
On 21 November, after almost nine months into the war of liberation, all three forces led a joint operation simultaneously, marking the day to be the day as Armed Forces Day. The joining of these forces resulted in large areas along the border to be liberated every day. This allowed the Bangladesh Forces to disrupt the lines of communication within a few days. This day bears special significance in the history of Bangladesh and is being celebrated every year with due solemnity and importance, to honour the sacrifices made by the members of the Bangladesh Armed forces, who fought and gave their lives in the liberation war.

History
Bangladesh Liberation War initially commenced in the form of resistance movement as the Pakistan Army cracked down on 25 March 1971 primarily at Dhaka and subsequently extending it to the entire of Bangladesh. Gradually, the Bangladesh Forces organised small groups of guerrilla fighters who followed 'hit and run' tactics. As a third stage in the war, the Bengali military personnel who were members of Pakistan Army, Navy and Air Force deserted their respective units to join Bangladesh Forces and organised them into regular units across the border of Indian territory primarily as Land Force.  A small group of Naval Commandos also opened the Naval wing and a few Pilots and Airmen formed the Air Wing.

Bangladesh Army
After a prolonged guerrilla warfare was launched by Bangladesh Forces, which continued for a number of months. A further restructuring was undertaken, and the Bangladesh Forces were organised into three brigade size combat groups.
 'Z' Force,: Lieutenant Colonel Ziaur Rahman was the commander of this force. The brigade was formed with the 1st, 3rd and 8th Battalion of East Bengal Regiment on 7 July 1971. The Z Force was raised at the foothills of Tura hill, opposite to Mymensingh.
 'K' Force: Lieutenant Colonel (later Brigadier) Khaled Mosharraf was the commander of this force. The brigade was formed at Agartala, with the 4th, 9th and 10th Battalion of East Bengal Regiment on the month of September 1971.
 'S' Force: Major K M Shafiullah was the commander of this force. The Brigade was formed at Hezamara, with the 2nd and 11th Battalion of East Bengal Regiment on the month of October 1971.

Bangladesh Navy
Many of the Bengali sailors and officers in the Pakistan Navy decamped, to form an emerging Bangladesh Navy. Initially, there were two ships BNS Padma (1973) and PALASH and 45 navy personnel. They prevented the supply of arms, ammunitions and rations for the occupation forces. This operation from the Naval Commandos made Ports in Chittagong and Mongla highly lethal for the occupation forces.

Bangladesh Air Force
The official date of formation of the Bangladesh Air Force (BAF) has been established as 28 September 1971 and it was launched formally by the Government on 8 October 1971. BAF was formed with all officers and airmen of Bengali origin serving in the Pakistan Air Force prior to the war. Out of 11 BDF Sectors, the most tactically significant sector, the Central Sector – Sector 11, was in command of a BAF officer including Sector 6.  The BAF started their operation from an abandoned airfield at Dimapur.

Programs
The day starts with laying of floral wreath at 'Shikha Anirban' (Eternal Flame) at Dhaka Cantonment by the President, the Prime Minister and the Service Chiefs. In the afternoon a reception at Senakunja, Dhaka Cantonment is held where the Prime Minister, ministers, the leader of opposition and other high civil and military officials attend. In other Cantonments, naval and air bases similar receptions are held. A special TV programme "Anirban" is broadcast on different TV channels the previous evening and special newspaper supplements are also published with national dailies. Receptions are also held by the Prime Minister and Service Chiefs for recipients of the gallantry award Freedom fighter. Improved meals for family members are served in all military stations. Armed Forces Division also brings out a special publication with articles related to the War of Independence and armed forces.

See also
 Armed Forces Day

References

Remembrance days
Public holidays in Bangladesh
Military history of Bangladesh
November observances